A portable media player (PMP) (also including the related digital audio player (DAP)) is a portable consumer electronics device capable of storing and playing digital media such as audio, images, and video files. The data is typically stored on a compact disc (CD), Digital Video Disc (DVD), Blu-ray Disc (BD), flash memory, microdrive, or hard drive; most earlier PMPs used physical media, but modern players mostly use flash memory. In contrast, analogue portable audio players play music from non-digital media that use analogue media, such as cassette tapes or vinyl records.

Digital audio players (DAP) were often marketed as MP3 players even if they also supported other file formats and media types. The PMP term was introduced later for devices that had additional capabilities such as video playback. Generally speaking, they are portable, employing internal or replaceable batteries, equipped with a 3.5 mm headphone jack which can be used for headphones or to connect to a boombox, shelf stereo system, or connect to car audio and home stereos wired or via a wireless connection such as Bluetooth. Some players also include radio tuners, voice recording and other features.

DAPs appeared in the late 1990s following the creation of the MP3 codec in Germany. MP3-playing devices were mostly pioneered by South Korean startups, who by 2002 would control the majority of global sales. However the industry would eventually be defined by the popular Apple iPod. In 2006, 20% of Americans owned a PMP, a figure strongly driven by the young; more than half (54%) of American teens owned one, as did 30% of young adults aged 18 to 34. In 2007, 210 million PMPs were sold worldwide, worth $19.5 billion. In 2008 video-enabled players would overtake audio-only players. Increasing sales of smartphones and tablet computers have led to a decline in sales of PMPs, leading to most devices being phased out, such as the iPod Touch on May 10, 2022, though certain flagship devices like the Sony Walkman are still in production. Portable DVD and BD players are still manufactured.

Types

Digital audio players are generally categorised by storage media:

Flash-based players: These are non-mechanical solid state devices that hold digital audio files on internal flash memory, removable flash memory cards or USB flash drive. Due to technological advances in flash memory, these originally low-capacity storage devices are now available commercially ranging up to 128 GB. Because they are solid state and do not have moving parts they require less battery power, will not skip during playback, and may be more resilient to hazards such as mechanical shock or fragmentation than hard disk-based players.
Hard drive-based players: Devices that read digital audio files from a hard disk drive. These players have higher capacities  ranging up to 500 GB. At typical encoding rates, this means that tens of thousands of songs can be stored on one player. The disadvantages with these units is that a hard drive consumes more power, is larger and heavier and is inherently more fragile than solid-state storage.
MP3 CD/DVD players: Portable CD players that can decode and play MP3 audio files stored on CDs. Such players were typically a less expensive alternative than either the hard drive or flash-based players when the first units of these were released. The blank CD-R media they use is inexpensive. These devices have the feature of being able to play standard audio CDs. A disadvantage is that due to the low rotational disk speed of these devices, they are even more susceptible to skipping or other misreads if they are subjected to acceleration (shaking) during playback. Since a CD can typically hold only around 700 megabytes of data, a large library will require multiple disks to contain. However, some higher-end units are also capable of reading and playing back files stored on larger-capacity DVD; some also have the ability to play video content, such as movies. An additional consideration can be the relatively large width of these devices since they have to be able to fit a CD.
Networked audio players: Players that connect via (WiFi) network to receive and play audio. These types of units typically do not have any local storage of their own and must rely on a server, typically a personal computer also on the same network, to provide the audio files for playback.

History

Today, every smartphone also serves as a portable media player; however, prior to the rise of smartphones in the 2007-2012 time frame, a variety of handheld players were available to store and play music. The immediate predecessor in the market place of the digital audio player was the portable CD player and prior to that, the personal stereo. In particular, Sony's Walkman and Discman are the ancestors of digital audio players such as Apple's iPod.

There are several types of MP3 players:
 Devices that play CDs. Often, they can be used to play both audio CDs and homemade data CDs containing MP3 or other digital audio files.
 Pocket devices. These are solid-state devices that hold digital audio files on internal or external media, such as memory cards. These are generally low-storage devices, typically ranging from 128MB to 1GB, which can often be extended with additional memory. As they are solid state and do not have moving parts, they can be very resilient. Such players are generally integrated into USB keydrives.
 Devices that read digital audio files from a hard drive. These players have higher capacities, ranging from 1.5GB to 100GB, depending on the hard drive technology. At typical encoding rates, this means that thousands of songs—perhaps an entire music collection—can be stored in one MP3 player. Apple's popular iPod player is the best-known example.

Early digital audio players
British scientist Kane Kramer invented the first digital audio player, which he called the IXI. His 1979 prototypes were capable of approximately one hour of audio playback but did not enter commercial production. His UK patent application was not filed until 1981 and was issued in 1985 in the UK and 1987 in the US. However, in 1988 Kramer's failure to raise the £60,000 required to renew the patent meant it entering the public domain, but he still owns the designs. Apple Inc. hired Kramer as a consultant and presented his work as an example of prior art in the field of digital audio players during their litigation with Burst.com almost two decades later. In 2008, Apple acknowledged Kramer as the inventor of the digital audio player The player was as big as a credit card and had a small LCD screen, navigation and volume buttons and would have held at least 8MB of data in a solid-state bubble memory chip with a capacity of 3 minutes' worth of audio. Plans were made for a 10-minute stereo memory card and the system was at one time fitted with a hard drive which would have enabled over an hour of recorded digital music. Later Kramer set up a company to promote the IXI and five working prototypes were produced with 16-bit sampling at 44.1 kilohertz with the pre-production prototype being unveiled at the APRS Audio/Visual trade exhibition in October 1986. 

The Listen Up Player was released in 1996 by Audio Highway, an American company led by Nathan Schulhof. It could store up to an hour of music, but despite getting an award at CES 1997 only 25 copies were made. That same year AT&T developed the FlashPAC digital audio player which initially used AT&T Perceptual Audio Coder (PAC) for music compression, but in 1997 switched to AAC. At about the same time AT&T also developed an internal Web based music streaming service that had the ability to download music to FlashPAC. AAC and such music downloading services later formed the foundation for the Apple iPod and iTunes.

The first production-volume portable digital audio player was The Audible Player (also known as MobilePlayer, or Digital Words To Go) from Audible.com available for sale in January 1998, for US$200. It only supported playback of digital audio in Audible's proprietary, low-bitrate format which was developed for spoken word recordings. Capacity was limited to 4 MB of internal flash memory, or about 2 hours of play, using a custom rechargeable battery pack. The unit had no display and rudimentary controls.

The MP3 standard

MP3 was introduced as an audio coding standard in 1994. It was based on several audio data compression techniques, including the modified discrete cosine transform (MDCT), FFT and psychoacoustic methods. The first portable MP3 player was launched in 1997 by Saehan Information Systems, which sold its "MPMan F10" player in South Korea in spring 1998. In mid-1998, the South Korean company licensed the players for North American distribution to Eiger Labs, which rebranded them as the EigerMan F10 and F20. The flash-based players were available in 32 MB or 64 MB (6 or 12 songs) storage capacity and had a LCD screen to tell the user the song currently playing. The first car audio hard drive-based MP3 player was also released in 1997 by MP32Go and was called the MP32Go Player. It consisted of a 3 GB IBM 2.5" hard drive that was housed in a trunk-mounted enclosure connected to the car's radio system. It retailed for $599 and was a commercial failure.

MP3 became a popular standard format and as a result most digital audio players after this supported it and hence were often called "MP3 players". Noticeably, major technology companies did not catch on with the new technology, and instead young startups would come to dominate the early era of MP3 players. The Rio PMP300 from Diamond Multimedia was introduced in September 1998, a few months after the MPMan, and also featured a 32 MB storage capacity. It was a success during the holiday season, with sales exceeding expectations. Interest and investment in digital music were subsequently spurred from it. Because of the player's notoriety as the target of a major lawsuit, the Rio is erroneously assumed to be the first digital audio player. The RIAA soon filed a lawsuit alleging that the device abetted illegal copying of music, but Diamond won a legal victory on the shoulders of Sony Corp. v. Universal City Studios and MP3 players were ruled legal devices. Eiger Labs and Diamond went on to establish a new segment in the portable audio player market and the following year saw several new manufacturers enter this market. The player would be the start of the Rio line of players.

Other early MP3 portables include Sensory Science's Rave MP2100, the I-Jam IJ-100, the Creative Labs Nomad and the RCA Lyra. These portables were small and light, but had only enough memory to hold around 7 to 20 songs at normal 128 kbit/s compression rates. They also used slower parallel port connections to transfer files from PC to player, necessary as most PCs then used the Windows 95 and NT operating systems, which did not have native support for USB connections. As more users migrated to Windows 98 by 2000, most players transitioned to USB. In 1999 the first hard drive based DAP using a 2.5" laptop drive was made, the Personal Jukebox (PJB-100) designed by Compaq and released by Hango Electronics Co with 4.8 GB storage, which held about 1,200 songs, and invented what would be called the jukebox segment of digital music portables. This segment eventually became the dominant type of digital music player.

Also at the end of 1999 the first in-dash MP3 player appeared. The Empeg Car and Rio Car (renamed after it was acquired by SONICblue and added to its Rio line of MP3 products) offered players in several capacities ranging from 5 to 28 GB. The unit didn't catch on as SONICblue had hoped, though, and was discontinued in the fall of 2001.

For the next couple of years, there were particularly much output from South Korean companies, namely the startups iRiver (brand of Reigncom), Mpio (brand of DigitalWay) and Cowon. At its peak, these Korean makers held as much as 40% world market share in MP3 players. These manufacturers however lost their way after 2004 as they failed to adapt to new iPods - they were also overtaken by the South Korean giant Samsung Electronics by 2006.

Sony entered the digital audio player market in 1999 with the Vaio Music Clip and Memory Stick Walkman, however they were technically not MP3 players as it did not support the MP3 format but instead Sony's own ATRAC format and WMA. The company's first MP3-supporting Walkman player did not come until 2004. The new Walkman players were originally referred to as "Network Walkman", with the introduction of the NW-MS7. This DAP plays audio files using ATRAC compression stored on a removable Memory Stick. Over the years, various hard-drive-based and flash-based DAPs and PMPs have been released under the Walkman range, albeit MP3 support only came in 2004.

Designed by Samsung Electronics, the Samsung YEPP line were first released in 1999 with the aim of making the smallest music players on the market. In 2000, Creative released the 6GB hard drive based Creative NOMAD Jukebox. The name borrowed the jukebox metaphor popularised by Remote Solution, also used by Archos. Later players in the Creative NOMAD range used microdrives rather than laptop drives. In October 2000, South Korean software company Cowon Systems released their first MP3 player, the CW100, under the brand name iAUDIO. Since then the company has released many different players. In December 2000, some months after the Creative's NOMAD Jukebox, Archos released its Jukebox 6000 with a 6GB hard drive. Philips also released a player called the Rush.

While popularly being called MP3 players at the time, most players could play more than just the MP3 file format, for example Windows Media Audio (WMA), Advanced Audio Coding (AAC), Vorbis, FLAC, Speex and Ogg. Many MP3 players can encode directly to MP3 or other digital audio format directly from a line in audio signal (radio, voice, etc.). Devices such as CD players can be connected to the MP3 player (using the USB port) in order to directly play music from the memory of the player without the use of a computer.

Modular MP3 keydrive players are composed of two detachable parts: the head (or reader/writer) and the body (the memory). They can be independently obtained and upgradable (one can change the head or the body; i.e. to add more memory).

Growth of market
On 23 October 2001, Apple Computer unveiled the first generation iPod, a 5 GB hard drive based DAP with a 1.8" hard drive and a 2" monochrome display. With the development of a spartan user interface and a smaller form factor, the iPod was initially popular within the Macintosh community. In July 2002, Apple introduced the second generation update to the iPod, which was compatible with Windows computers through Musicmatch Jukebox. iPods quickly became the most popular DAP product and led the fast growth of this market during the early and mid 2000s.

In 2002, Archos released the first "portable media player" (PMP), the Archos Jukebox Multimedia with a little 1.5" colour screen. Manufacturers have since implemented abilities to view images and play videos into their devices. The next year, Archos released another multimedia jukebox, the AV300, with a 3.8" screen and a 20GB hard drive. In the same year, Toshiba released the first Gigabeat. In 2003, Dell launched a line of portable digital music players called Dell DJ. They were discontinued by 2006.

The name "MP4 player" was a marketing term for inexpensive portable media players, usually from little known or generic device manufacturers. The name itself is a misnomer, since most MP4 players through 2007 were incompatible with the MPEG-4 Part 14 or the .mp4 container format. Instead, the term refers to their ability to play more file types than just MP3. In this sense, in some markets like Brazil, any new function added to a given media player is followed by an increase in the number, for example an MP5 or MP12 Player, despite there being no corresponding MPEG-5 standard (the current standard, still being developed, is MPEG-4).

iriver of South Korea originally made portable CD players and then started making digital audio players and portable media players from 2002. Creative also introduced the ZEN line. Both of these attained high popularity in some regions.

In 2004, Microsoft attempted to take advantage of the growing PMP market by launching the Portable Media Center (PMC) platform. It was introduced at the 2004 Consumer Electronics Show with the announcement of the Zen Portable Media Center, which was co-developed by Creative. The Microsoft Zune series would later be based on the Gigabeat S, one of the PMC-implemented players.

In May 2005, flash memory maker SanDisk entered the PMP market with the Sansa line of players, starting with the e100 series, and then following up with the m200 series, and c100 series.

In 2007, Apple introduced the iPod Touch, the first iPod with a multi-touch screen. Some similar products existed before such as the iriver clix in 2006. In South Korea, sales of MP3 players peaked in 2006, but started declining afterwards. This was driven partly by the launch of mobile television services (DMB), which along with increased demand of movies on the go led to a transition away from music-only players to PMPs. By 2008, more video-enabled PMPs were sold than audio-only players.

Brands and popularity throughout the world
By the mid-2000s and the years after, Apple with its iPod was the best selling DAP/PMP by a significant margin, with one of out four sold worldwide being an iPod. It was especially dominant in the United States where it had over 70% of sales at different points in time, is nearest competitor in 2006 being SanDisk. Apple also led in Japan over its homegrown makers Sony and Panasonic during this time, although the gap between Apple and Sony had closed by about 2010. In South Korea, the market was led by local brands iriver, Samsung and Cowon as of 2005.

European buying patterns differed; while Apple was in a particularly strong position in the United Kingdom, continental Western Europe generally preferred cheaper, often Chinese rebranded players under local brands such as Grundig. Meanwhile, in Eastern Europe including Russia, higher priced players with improved design or functionality were preferred instead, and here Korean makers like iriver and Samsung were particularly popular, as well as such OEM models under local brands.

Creative was the top selling maker in its home country of Singapore. In China, local brands Newman, DEC and Aigo were noted as the top vendors as of 2006.

PMPs in other categories

Samsung SPH-M2100, the first mobile phone with built-in MP3 player was produced in South Korea in August 1999. Samsung SPH-M100 (UpRoar) launched in 2000 was the first mobile phone to have MP3 music capabilities in the US market. The innovation spread rapidly across the globe and by 2005, more than half of all music sold in South Korea was sold directly to mobile phones and all major handset makers in the world had released MP3 playing phones. By 2006, more MP3 playing mobile phones were sold than all stand-alone MP3 players put together. The rapid rise of the media player in phones was quoted by Apple as a primary reason for developing the iPhone. In 2007, the number of phones that could play media was over 1 billion. Some companies have created music-centric sub-brands for mobile phones, for example the former Sony Ericsson's Walkman range or Nokia's XpressMusic range, which have extra emphasis on music playback and typically have features such as dedicated music buttons.

Mobile phones with PMP functionalities such as video playback also started appearing in the 2000s. Other non-phone products such as the PlayStation Portable and PlayStation Vita have also been considered to be PMPs.

Decline and contemporary

DAPs and PMPs have declined in popularity after the late 2000s due to increasing worldwide adoption of smartphones that already come with PMP functionalities. Sales peaked in 2007 and market revenue (worth $21.6 billion) peaked in 2008, albeit notably mobile phones that could play music outsold DAPs by almost three to one as of 2007.

In the EU, demand for MP3 players peaked in 2007 with 43.5 million devices sold totalling 3.8 billion euros. Both sales and revenue experienced a double-digit shrinkage for the first time in 2010. In India, sales of PMPs decreased for the first time in 2012, a few years after developed economies. The market was led by Apple with a share of about 50%, while Sony and Philips were the other major brands.

Meanwhile, sales of the best selling product, the iPod, was eclipsed by the company's iPhone smartphone by 2011.

DAPs continue to be made in lower volumes by manufacturers such as SanDisk, Sony, IRIVER, Philips, Apple, Cowon, and a range of Chinese manufacturers namely Aigo, Newsmy, PYLE and ONDA. They often have specific selling points in the smartphone era, such as portability (for small sized players) or for high quality sound suited for audiophiles.

Typical features
PMPs are capable of playing digital audio, images, and/or video. Usually, a colour liquid crystal display (LCD) or organic light-emitting diode (OLED) screen is used as a display for PMPs that have a screen. Various players include the ability to record video, usually with the aid of optional accessories or cables, and audio, with a built-in microphone or from a line out cable or FM tuner. Some players include readers for memory cards, which are advertised to equip players with extra storage or transferring media. In some players, features of a personal organiser are emulated, or support for video games, like the iriver clix (through compatibility of Adobe Flash Lite) or the PlayStation Portable, is included.  Only mid-range to high-end players support "savestating" for power-off (i.e. leaves off song/video in progress similar to tape-based media).

Audio playback

Nearly all players are compatible with the MP3 audio format, and many others support Windows Media Audio (WMA), Advanced Audio Coding (AAC) and WAV. Some players are compatible with open-source formats like Ogg Vorbis and the Free Lossless Audio Codec (FLAC). Audio files purchased from online stores may include digital rights management (DRM) copy protection, which many modern players support.

Image viewing
The JPEG format is widely supported by players. Some players, like the iPod series, provide compatibility to display additional file formats like GIF, PNG, and TIFF, while others are bundled with conversion software.

Video playback

Most newer players support the MPEG-4 Part 2 video format, and many other players are compatible with Windows Media Video (WMV) and AVI. Software included with the players may be able to convert video files into a compatible format.

Recording

Many players have a built-in electret microphone which allows recording. Usually recording quality is poor, suitable for speech but not music. There are also professional-quality recorders suitable for high-quality music recording with external microphones, at prices starting at a few hundred dollars.

Radio
Some DAPs have FM radio tuners built in. Many also have an option to change the band from the usual 87.5 – 108.0 MHz to the Japanese band of 76.0 – 90.0 MHz.  DAPs typically never have an AM band, or even HD Radio since such features would be either cost-prohibitive for the application, or because of AM's sensitivity to interference.

Internet access
Newer portable media players are now coming with Internet access via Wi-Fi. Examples of such devices are Android OS devices by various manufacturers, and iOS devices on Apple products like the iPhone, iPod Touch, and iPad. Internet access has even enabled people to use the Internet as an underlying communications layer for their choice of music for automated music randomisation services like Pandora, to on-demand video access (which also has music available) such as YouTube. This technology has enabled casual and hobbyist DJs to cue their tracks from a smaller package from an Internet connection, sometimes they will use two identical devices on a crossfade mixer. Many such devices also tend to be smartphones.

Last position memory

Many mobile digital media players have last position memory, in which when it is powered off, a user doesn't have to worry about starting at the first track again, or even hearing repeats of others songs when a playlist, album, or whole library is cued for shuffle play, in which shuffle play is a common feature, too. Early playback devices to even remotely have "last position memory" that predated solid-state digital media playback devices were tape-based media, except this kind suffered from having to be "rewound", whereas disc-based media suffered from no native "last position memory", unless disc-players had their own last position memory. However, some models of solid-state flash memory (or hard drive ones with some moving parts) are somewhat the "best of both worlds" in the market.

Miscellaneous 
Media players' firmware may be equipped with a basic file manager and a text reader.

Common audio formats
There are three categories of audio formats:

 Uncompressed PCM audio: Most players can also play uncompressed PCM in a container such as WAV or AIFF.
 Lossless audio formats: These formats maintain the Hi-fi quality of every song or disc. These are the ones used by CDs, many people recommend the use of lossless audio formats to preserve the CD quality in audio files on a desktop. Some of them are: Apple Lossless (proprietary format) and FLAC (Royalties free) are increasingly popular formats for lossless compression, which maintain the Hi-fi quality.
 Lossy compression formats: Most audio formats use lossy compression, to produce as small as possible a file compatible with the desired sound quality. There is a trade-off between size and sound quality of lossily compressed files; most formats allow different combinations—e.g., MP3 files may use between 32 (worst), 128 (reasonable) and 320 (best) kilobits per second.

There are also royalty free lossy formats like Vorbis for general music and Speex and Opus used for voice recordings. When "ripping" music from CDs, many people recommend the use of lossless audio formats to preserve the CD quality in audio files on a desktop, and to transcode the music to lossy compression formats when they are copied to a portable player. The formats supported by a particular audio player depends upon its firmware; sometimes a firmware update adds more formats. MP3 and AAC are dominant formats, and are almost universally supported.

Software

PMPs were earlier packaged with an installation CD/DVD that inserts device drivers (and for some players, software that is capable of seamlessly transferring files between the player and the computer). For later players, however, these are usually available online via the manufacturers' websites, or increasingly natively recognised by the operating system through Universal Mass Storage (UMS) or Media Transfer Protocol (MTP).

Hardware

Storage
As with DAPs, PMPs come in either flash or hard disk storage. Storage capacities have reached up to 64 GB for flash memory based PMPs, first reached by the 3rd Generation iPod Touch, and up to 1 TB for hard disk drive PMPs, first achieved by the Archos 5 Internet Tablet.

A number of players support memory card slots, including CompactFlash (CF), Secure Digital (SD), and Memory Sticks. They are used to directly transfer content from external devices, and expand the storage capacity of PMPs.

Interface
A standard PMP uses a 5-way D-pad to navigate. Many alternatives have been used, most notably the wheel and touch mechanisms seen on players from the iPod and Sansa series. Another popular mechanism is the swipe-pad, or 'squircle', first seen on the Zune. Additional buttons are commonly seen for features such as volume control.

Screen
Sizes range all the way up to 7 inches (18 cm). Resolutions also vary, going up to WVGA. Most screens come with a colour depth of 16-bit, but higher quality video-oriented devices may range all the way to 24-bit, otherwise known as true colour, with the ability to display 16.7 million distinct colours. Screens commonly have a matte finish but may also come in glossy to increase colour intensity and contrast. More and more devices are now also coming with touch screen as a form of primary or alternate input. This can be for convenience and/or aesthetic purposes. Certain devices, on the other hand, have no screen whatsoever, reducing costs at the expense of ease of browsing through the media library.

Radio
Some portable media players include a radio receiver, most frequently receiving FM.  Features for receiving signals from FM stations on MP3 players are common on more premium models.

Other features
Some portable media players have recently added features such as simple camera, built-in game emulation (playing Nintendo Entertainment System or other game formats from ROM images) and simple text readers and editors. Newer PMPs have been able to tell time, and even automatically adjust time according to radio reception, and some devices like the 6th-gen iPod Nano even have wristwatch bands available.

Modern MP4 players can play video in a multitude of video formats without the need to pre-convert them or downsize them prior to playing them. Some MP4 Players possess USB ports, to allow users to connect it to a personal computer to sideload files. Some models also have memory card slots to expand the memory of the player instead of storing files in the built-in memory.

Chipsets
Chipsets and file formats that are particular to some PMPs:

Anyka is a chip that's used by many MP4 Players. It supports the same formats as Rockchip.
Fuzhou Rockchip Electronics's video processing Rockchip has been incorporated into many MP4 players, supporting AVI with no B frames in MPEG-4 Part 2 (not Part 14), while MP2 audio compression is used. The clip must be padded out, if necessary, to fit the resolution of the display. Any slight deviation from the supported format results in a Format Not Supported error message.
Some players, like the Onda VX979+, have started to use chipsets from Ingenic, which are capable of supporting RealNetworks's video formats. Also, players with SigmaTel-based technology are compatible with SMV (SigmaTel Video).

AMV 

The image compression algorithm of this format is inefficient by modern standards (about 4 pixels per byte, compared with over 10 pixels per byte for MPEG-2). There are a fixed range of resolutions (96 × 96 to 208 × 176 pixels) and framerates (12 or 16 frames) available. However it can be used with limited hardware requirements. A 30-minute video would have a filesize of approximately 100 MB at a 160 × 120 resolution.

MTV 
The MTV video format (no relation to the cable network) consists of a 512-byte file header that operates by displaying a series of raw image frames during MP3 playback. During this process, audio frames are passed to the chipset's decoder, while the memory pointer of the display's hardware is adjusted to the next image within the video stream. This method does not require additional hardware for decoding, though it will lead to a higher amount of memory consumption. For that reason, the storage capacity of an MP4 player that uses MTV files is effectively less than that of a player that decompresses files on the fly.

Operation

Digital sampling is used to convert an audio wave to a sequence of binary numbers that can be stored in a digital format, such as MP3. Common features of all MP3 players are a memory storage device, such as flash memory or a miniature hard disk drive, an embedded processor, and an audio codec microchip to convert the compressed file into an analogue sound signal. During playback, audio files are read from storage into a RAM based memory buffer, and then streamed through an audio codec to produce decoded PCM audio. Typically audio formats decode at double to more than 20 times real speed on portable electronic processors, requiring that the codec output be stored for a time until the DAC can play it. To save power, portable devices may spend much or nearly all of their time in a low power idle state while waiting for the DAC to deplete the output PCM buffer before briefly powering up to decode additional audio.

Most DAPs are powered by rechargeable batteries, some of which are not user-replaceable. They have a 3.5 mm stereo jack; music can be listened to with earbuds or headphones, or played via an external amplifier and speakers. Some devices also contain internal speakers, through which music can be listened to, although these built-in speakers are typically of very low quality.

Nearly all DAPs consists of some kind of display screen, although there are exceptions, such as the iPod Shuffle, and a set of controls with which the user can browse through the library of music contained in the device, select a track, and play it back. The display, if the unit even has one, can be anything from a simple one or two line monochrome LCD display, similar to what are found on typical pocket calculators, to large, high-resolution, full-color displays capable of displaying photographs or viewing video content on. The controls can range anywhere from the simple buttons as are found on most typical CD players, such as for skipping through tracks or stopping/starting playback to full touch-screen controls, such as that found on the iPod Touch or the Zune HD. One of the more common methods of control is some type of the scroll wheel with associated buttons. This method of control was first introduced with the Apple iPod and many other manufacturers have created variants of this control scheme for their respective devices.

Content is placed on DAPs typically through a process called "syncing", by connecting the device to a personal computer, typically via USB, and running any special software that is often provided with the DAP on a CD-ROM included with the device, or downloaded from the manufacturer's website. Some devices simply appear as an additional disk drive on the host computer, to which music files are simply copied like any other type of file. Other devices, most notably the Apple iPod or Microsoft Zune, requires the use of special management software, such as iTunes or Zune Software, respectively. The music, or other content such as TV episodes or movies, is added to the software to create a "library". The library is then "synced" to the DAP via the software. The software typically provides options for managing situations when the library is too large to fit on the device being synced to. Such options include allowing manual syncing, in that the user can manually "drag-n-drop" the desired tracks to the device, or allow for the creation of playlists. In addition to the USB connection, some of the more advanced units are now starting to allow syncing through a wireless connection, such as via Wi-Fi or Bluetooth.

Content can also be obtained and placed on some DAPs, such as the iPod Touch or Zune HD by allowing access to a "store" or "marketplace", most notably the iTunes Store or Zune Marketplace, from which content, such as music and video, and even games, can be purchased and downloaded directly to the device.

Digital signal processing

A growing number of portable media players are including audio processing chips that allow digital effects like 3D audio effects, dynamic range compression and equalisation of the frequency response. Some devices adjust loudness based on Fletcher–Munson curves. Some media players are used with Noise-cancelling headphones that use Active noise reduction to remove background noise.

De-noise mode
De-noise mode is an alternative to Active noise reduction. It provides for relatively noise-free listening to audio in a noisy environment. In this mode, audio intelligibility is improved due to selective gain reduction of the ambient noise. This method splits external signals into frequency components by "filterbank" (according to the peculiarities of human perception of specific frequencies) and processing them using adaptive audio compressors. Operation thresholds in adaptive audio compressors (in contrast to "ordinary" compressors) are regulated depending on ambient noise levels for each specific bandwidth. Reshaping of the processed signal from adaptive compressor outputs is realised in a synthesis filterbank. This method improves the intelligibility of speech signals and music. The best effect is obtained while listening to audio in the environment with constant noise (in trains, automobiles, planes), or in environments with fluctuating noise level (e.g. in a metro). Improvement of signal intelligibility in condition of ambient noise allows users to hear audio well and preserve hearing ability, in contrast to regular volume amplification.

Natural mode
Natural mode is characterised by subjective effect of balance of different frequency sounds, regardless of level of distortion, appearing in the reproduction device. It is also regardless of personal user's ability to perceive specific sound frequencies (excluding obvious hearing loss). The natural effect is obtained due to special sound processing algorithm (i.e. "formula of subjective equalisation of frequency-response function"). Its principle is to assess frequency response function (FRF) of mediaplayer or any other sound reproduction device, in accordance with audibility threshold in silence (subjective for each person), and to apply gain modifying factor. The factor is determined with the help of integrated function to test audibility threshold: the program generates tone signals (with divergent oscillations – from minimum volume 30–45 Hz to maximum volume appr. 16 kHz), and user assess their subjective audibility. The principle is similar to in situ audiometry, used in medicine to prescribe a hearing aid. However, the results of test may be used to a limited extent as far as FRF of sound devices depends on reproduction volume. It means correction coefficient should be determined several times – for various signal strengths, which is not a particular problem from a practical standpoint.

Sound around mode
Sound around mode allows for real time overlapping of music and the sounds surrounding the listener in their environment, which are captured by a microphone and mixed into the audio signal. As a result, the user may hear playing music and external sounds of the environment at the same time. This can increase user safety (especially in big cities and busy streets), as a user can hear a mugger following them or hear an oncoming car.

Controversy

Although these issues are not usually controversial within digital audio players, they are matters of continuing controversy and litigation, including but not limited to content distribution and protection, and digital rights management (DRM).

Lawsuit with RIAA

The Recording Industry Association of America (RIAA) filed a lawsuit in late 1998 against Diamond Multimedia for its Rio players, alleging that the device encouraged copying music illegally. But Diamond won a legal victory on the shoulders of the Sony Corp. v. Universal City Studios case and DAPs were legally ruled as electronic devices.

Risk of hearing damage
According to the Scientific Committee on Emerging and Newly Identified Health Risks, the risk of hearing damage from digital audio players depends on both sound level and listening time. The listening habits of most users are unlikely to cause hearing loss, but some people are putting their hearing at risk, because they set the volume control very high or listen to music at high levels for many hours per day. Such listening habits may result in temporary or permanent hearing loss, tinnitus, and difficulties understanding speech in noisy environments.
The World Health Organization warns that increasing use of headphones and earphones puts 1.1 billion teenagers and young adults at risk of hearing loss due to unsafe use of personal audio devices. Many smartphones and personal media players are sold with earphones that do a poor job of blocking ambient noise, leading some users to turn up the volume to the maximum level to drown out street noise. People listening to their media players on crowded commutes sometimes play music at high volumes feel a sense of separation, freedom and escape from their surroundings.

The World Health Organization recommends that "the highest permissible level of noise exposure in the workplace is 85 dB up to a maximum of eight hours per day" and time in "nightclubs, bars and sporting events" should be limited because they can expose patrons to noise levels of 100 dB. The report states

The report also recommends that governments raise awareness of hearing loss, and to recommend people visit a hearing specialist if they experience symptoms of hearing loss, which include pain, ringing or buzzing in the ears.

A study by the National Institute for Occupational Safety & Health found that employees at bars, nightclubs or other music venues were exposed to noise levels above the internationally recommended limits of 82–85 dB(A per eight hours. This growing phenomena has led to the coining of the term music-induced hearing loss, which includes hearing loss as a result of overexposure to music on personal media players.

FCC issues
Some MP3 players have electromagnet transmitters, as well as receivers. Many MP3 players have built-in FM radios, but FM transmitters aren't usually built-in due to liability of transmitter feedback from simultaneous transmission and reception of FM. Also, certain features like Wi-Fi and Bluetooth can interfere with professional-grade communications systems such as aircraft at airports.

See also

Comparison of portable media players
Digital video recorder
Internet radio device
Mixtape
Notel
Portable DVD player
Walkman Circ
Tekpix

References

External links

 Collecting MP3 Portables – Part I, Part II and Part III – Richard Menta's three-part article covers the first digital audio players on the market with pictures of each player.

 
 
 
MP3
Boombox culture
Audio hobbies